is a Japanese politician of the Liberal Democratic Party and currently a member of the House of Councillors in the Diet (national legislature). She served as governor of the prefecture of Hokkaido for four terms from 2003 to 2019. She graduated from Hitotsubashi University with a Bachelor of Economics degree in 1976. She started her career as a bureaucrat in the Ministry of Economy, Trade and Industry and quit in 2003. She was elected in April 2003, becoming the first female governor of Hokkaido and the fourth female governor in Japanese history.

External links 
 An article on the electoral campaign of Harumi Takahashi, published by the American Political Science Association (PDF)
 Governor of Hokkaido website 
 Personal website 

1954 births
Living people
People from Toyama (city)
Hitotsubashi University alumni
Governors of Hokkaido
Female Japanese governors
Members of the House of Councillors (Japan)
Politicians from Hokkaido